COVID LA may refer to:
COVID-19 pandemic in Los Angeles
COVID-19 pandemic in Louisiana